The spotted palm thrush (Cichladusa guttata), also known as the spotted morning-thrush, is a species of bird in the family Muscicapidae.  It is found in Ethiopia, Kenya, Somalia, Sudan, Tanzania, and Uganda.  Its natural habitats are subtropical or tropical dry forests, dry savanna, and subtropical or tropical moist shrubland.

References

spotted palm thrush
Birds of East Africa
spotted palm thrush
Taxa named by Theodor von Heuglin
Taxonomy articles created by Polbot